Rizhskaya is a railway station of Moscow Railway on  in Moscow, that serving lines D2 and D4 of the Moscow Central Diameters and the regional trains of Russian Railways. It was opened in 1949.

Gallery

References

Railway stations in Moscow
Railway stations of Moscow Railway
Railway stations in Russia opened in 1949
Line D2 (Moscow Central Diameters) stations